Hiding Places is a collaborative studio album by Brooklyn rapper Billy Woods and Los Angeles record producer Kenny Segal. It was released by Backwoodz Studioz on March 29, 2019. It features guest appearances from Mothermary, Elucid, and Self Jupiter.

Background
Kenny Segal produced Milo's 2015 album So the Flies Don't Come, which featured a guest appearance from Elucid. Elucid is one half of the duo Armand Hammer along with Billy Woods. Segal went on to provide the beats to Armand Hammer's albums Rome and Paraffin. After that, Woods and Segal decided to create a collaborative album.

Critical reception

Marcus J. Moore of Pitchfork gave the album a 7.7 out of 10, writing: "In a way, Hiding Places plays like a complement to early-00s underground New York rap, and sits alongside early Definitive Jux records." He added: "There's an edginess to the record, similar to Cannibal Ox's The Cold Vein, a feeling that the rapper will either self-destruct or nuke everything in his wake." Tom Breihan of Stereogum wrote: "The album works as a sweaty, jangled rumination on stress and fear and hopelessness and grim acceptance." Paul Thompson of The Fader called it "[Billy Woods'] leanest and his best [record]".

Accolades

Track listing

Personnel
Credits adapted from liner notes.

 Billy Woods – vocals
 Kenny Segal – production, mixing
 Ryan Crosby – guitar (1, 4)
 Mothermary – vocals (6), additional production (6)
 Elucid – vocals (8)
 Blockhead – co-production (8)
 Self Jupiter – vocals (9)
 Steel Tipped Dove – engineering
 Willie Green – mastering

References

External links
 

2019 albums
Collaborative albums
Billy Woods albums
Albums produced by Kenny Segal
Hip hop albums by American artists